Bilal Dib (born 17 August 1985), known as Billy Dib, is an Australian professional boxer. He held the IBF featherweight title from 2011 to 2013, and the IBO super-featherweight title in 2008.

Early years 
Dib was born on 17 August 1985 at Kogarah Hospital in Sydney. He has suffered from chronic asthma since birth, and he spent the first six months of his life in an incubator fighting the ailment. He took up boxing at the age of 12 to try to overcome the condition. His parents had emigrated to Australia from Lebanon, and owned a small greengrocer store in Engadine, where he grew up.

Amateur career
After starting boxing at the age of 12 at the local Police and Community Youth Club (PCYC), he soon began appearing in amateur competitions, winning 98 out of 113 bouts. During this period he was the Australian Champion on three occasions, and he was selected to train at the Australian Institute of Sport (AIS). However, his preparation for the 2004 Olympic Games was hindered by a motorcycle accident, and he was not selected for the Australian team. He subsequently turned down an offer to join Lebanon's Olympic team, arguing that he had been representing Australia and would not feel right if drawn against an Australian in the tournament as Australia was his, and his family's home.

After missing out on the Olympics Dib traveled to Sheffield to train with Prince Naseem Hamed, who encouraged him to turn professional.

Professional career

Dib's first professional fight was against Chad Roy Naidu in August 2004, as an 18-year-old. He won, and subsequently went on to win the next 20 bouts, not losing until October 2008, against Steven Luevano. Dib traveled to the United States in 2006, after being offered the opportunity to train with Mike Tyson. While there he met Shane Mosley, and this led to Dib signing with Golden Boy Promotions.

IBO super-featherweight title challenge
On 30 July 2008, Billy Dib faced South African Zolani Marali for the IBO super featherweight title. Although Marali had a greater reach, and despite being knocked down in the third round, Dib was able to win on a unanimous points decision (116–114, 116–112 and 114–113), allowing him to capture the title.

WBO featherweight title challenge
Billy Dib fought against Steven Luevano, the WBO featherweight champion, on 18 October 2008. He was unsuccessful, losing to Luevano in a unanimous points decision. After the match Dib announced that he would come back as a better boxer, stating that he would learn from the experience.

Return after first loss
On Wednesday, 11 March 2009, at the Campbelltown Cube in Sydney, Dib returned to the ring in a spectacular performance, beating 22-year-old local Campbelltown fighter undefeated Davey Browne Jnr via an 8th round technical decision after Browne was cut above both eyes. The first cut opened after an accidental head clash, while the second came from a clean punch. The fight was stopped on the first cut and went to the scorecards.

On 9 July 2009, Billy Dib and Kenichi Yamaguchi were the main event on One HD's first Superboxer promotion. After being knocked down during the opening stages of the first round, Dib rallied late in the piece to down Yamaguchi. While Yamaguchi was on his knees, Dib hit him with a late left-handed punch, and although Yamaguchi returned to his feet, he appeared unsteady, leading the referee to stop the fight at 2:59 seconds of the first round in Dib's favour. As Yamaguchi protested the call to the referee Dib without reason shoved Yamaguchi as well as his trainer sparking a small brawl between the two corners.

Questions regarding the decision were raised after the fight, with some expressing the belief that the punch constituted a foul, and thus Yamaguchi should either have been given time to recover, the fight declared a no-contest, or Dib should have been disqualified.

Subsequently, the NSW Boxing Authority announced that they are undertaking an investigation into the events, and at their monthly board meeting on 4 August, the officials determined to change the result to a no-contest.

IBF featherweight champion
After nine straight victories, in July 2011 Dib took on longtime contender Jorge Lacierva and captured the IBF Featherweight belt via Unanimous Decision. Occasionally getting involved in some wild exciting exchanges, for the most part he boxed a disciplined fight, out-boxing his smaller opponent.

On 19 November 2011, Billy made the first defense of his title, knocking out Italian challenger Alberto Servidei in 2:38 of the first round from a left hook to the body.

Dib made his second title defense against Eduardo Escobedo on 7 March 2012 in retaining his title with a seventh-round TKO, his aggressive body attack broke down Escobedo who did not come out for round seven.

He lost the title to Evgeny Gradovich on 1 March 2013. A rematch between the two was scheduled for 23 November 2013, when Evgeny Gradovich won by TKO in the 9th round.

Dib vs. Farmer 
On 3 August 2018, Dib fought Tevin Farmer for the vacant IBF super featherweight championship. Farmer was ranked #4 by the IBF at the time. Farmer dominated Dib and dropped him once en route to a convincing unanimous decision win, 120–107, 119-108 and 118–109.

Dib vs. Khan 
After a brief retirement following a loss to Tevin Farmer in 2018, Dib returned to the ring in August 2019, losing in a WBC welterweight title fight to Amir Khan. Dib lost via a fourth-round TKO. Khan was ranked #15 by the WBC at welterweight.

He has fought three times since his come back, twice in 2019, once in 2021. He is brothers to professional boxer, Youssef, and New South Wales Labor MP, Jihad.

Professional boxing record

Media appearances
In 2022, Dib competed on the reality competition series The Challenge: Australia.

References

External links

Billy Dib - Profile, News Archive & Current Rankings at Box.Live

1985 births
Australian people of Lebanese descent
Sportspeople of Lebanese descent
Boxers from Sydney
International Boxing Federation champions
International Boxing Organization champions
Australian Muslims
Sportsmen from New South Wales
Living people
Australian male boxers
World featherweight boxing champions
Super-featherweight boxers
The Challenge (TV series) contestants